The 1909 Virginia gubernatorial election was held on November 2, 1909 to elect the governor of Virginia.

Results

References

1909
Virginia
gubernatorial
November 1909 events